German submarine U-509 was a Type IXC U-boat of Nazi Germany's Kriegsmarine during World War II. The submarine was laid down on 1 November 1940 at the Deutsche Werft yard in Hamburg as yard number 305. She was launched on 19 August 1941, and commissioned on 4 November 1941 under the command of Korvettenkapitän Karl-Heinz Wolff.

The U-boat served with the 4th U-boat Flotilla for training, before being assigned to the 10th U-boat Flotilla from 1 July 1942, for front-line service.

Design
German Type IXC submarines were slightly larger than the original Type IXBs. U-509 had a displacement of  when at the surface and  while submerged. She had two shafts and two  propellers.

U-509 was fitted with six  torpedo tubes (four fitted at the bow and two at the stern), 22 torpedoes, one  SK C/32 naval gun, 180 rounds, and a  SK C/30 as well as a  C/30 anti-aircraft gun. The boat had a complement of forty-eight.

Service history

First patrol
U-509 sailed from Kiel on 25 June 1942, across the Atlantic, into the Caribbean Sea and along the coast of South America, without any successes. She arrived at her new home port of Lorient in occupied France on 12 September after 80 days at sea.

Second patrol
U-509 departed from Lorient on 15 October 1942, now under the command of Oberleutnant zur See Werner Witte. Operating in the waters west of the Canary Islands as part of wolfpack Streitaxt (English : "Battle axe") she attacked Convoy SL 125, sinking four ships and damaging three more.

Convoy SL 125
At 17:40 on 26 October the U-boat attacked the 7,705 GRT British tanker Anglo Mærsk, a straggler, with a single torpedo with no apparent effect. The entire crew: master, 32 crewmen, and two gunners, landed at Hierro Island, Canary Islands, on 27 October.

At 22.33 and 22.38 hours on 27 October, U-509 fired torpedoes at the convoy and sank two British merchant ships. The 7,951 GRT Pacific Star did not sink immediately, but the crew abandoned ship, and she was last seen on 30 October, very low in the water, and probably sank shortly afterwards. The 6,148 GRT Stentor was the ship of the vice-commodore of the convoy Captain Richard Hart Garstin, CBE, RNR, and was carrying 125 passengers, including 26 army personnel, 11 nursing sisters and six naval staff members.

Between 22.00 and 22.09 hours on 28 October, U-509 fired five torpedoes at the convoy and hit two more British merchant ships. The 5,283 GRT Nagpore was carrying 7,000 tons of general cargo, including 1,501 tons of copper, as well as being the flagship of the convoy's commodore Rear Admiral Sir C.N. Reyne, KBE, RN. As she sank, the master, 18 crewmen, and one naval staff member were lost. The 5,178 GRT Hopecastle was badly damaged. Three crewmen and two gunners were lost, and her crew abandoned ship. The master and 20 survivors were picked up by the British merchant ship Mano, and another 19 survivors later landed at Funchal, Madeira.

At 22:16 on 29 October 1942, the U-boat hit the 7,131 GRT British merchant ship Corinaldo with a single torpedo. The ship, loaded with 5,141 tons of frozen meat from Buenos Aires, dropped out of the convoy and was abandoned. Seven crew members and one gunner were lost. At 02:07 the next day,  struck the ship with two torpedoes, but she remained afloat.

Finally, at midnight on 30 October the U-boat torpedoed and sank the 4,772 GRT British merchant ship Brittany near Madeira. Twelve crewmen, one gunner, and one passenger were lost. The master, 32 crewmen, seven gunners, and three passengers were picked up by the British auxiliary patrol vessel .

U-509 then sailed for the waters off Morocco to operate against the Allied ships taking part in the Operation Torch landings. U-509 received some damage, forcing her to abort the patrol and return to Lorient on 26 November after 43 days at sea.

Third patrol
U-509s next patrol took her far south, to the waters off South Africa. Leaving Lorient on 23 December 1942, she made her first kill at 02:19 on 10 February, sinking the 4,937 GRT British merchant ship Queen Anne eight miles south-south-west of Cape Agulhas. The U-boat was attacked by the ASW trawler  with gunfire and seven depth charges, but was not damaged and made her escape. The master, two crewmen and two gunners from Queen Anne were lost. Eighteen survivors were picked up by St. Zeno, while 22 survivors later made landfall at Bredasdorp.

The U-boat struck again at 22:00 on 2 April, torpedoing the 7,129 GRT British passenger ship City of Baroda of Convoy NC-9 north-west of Cape Town. The badly damaged vessel was towed to Lüderitz Bay, South West Africa and beached. Later she broke in two, and was declared a total loss. One crewman and seven passengers were lost.

U-509 returned to Lorient on 11 May after a voyage lasting 140 days.

Fourth patrol
The U-boat's final patrol began on 3 July 1943, under the command of the newly promoted Korvettenkapitän Werner Witte, and sailing south-west to the waters south of the Azores. There on 15 July, north-west of Madeira, in position , she was sunk with all hands by aerial FIDO torpedoes from a Grumman TBF Avenger bombers of Navy squadron VC-29 flying from the escort carrier .

Wolfpacks
U-509 took part in two wolfpacks, namely:
 Streitaxt (20 October – 2 November 1942) 
 Schlagetot (9 – 15 November 1942)

Summary of raiding history

References

Bibliography

External links

 convoyweb.org.uk British convoy SL-125

1941 ships
German Type IX submarines
Ships built in Hamburg
U-boats commissioned in 1941
U-boats sunk by US aircraft
U-boats sunk in 1943
World War II shipwrecks in the Atlantic Ocean
World War II submarines of Germany
Ships lost with all hands
Maritime incidents in July 1943